International sanctions have been imposed during the Russo-Ukrainian War by a large number of countries, including the United States, Canada, the European Union, and a number of international organisations against Russia, Crimea, and Belarus following the Russian invasion of Ukraine, which began in late February 2014. These sanctions were imposed against individuals, businesses and officials from Russia, Belarus and Ukraine.

Impacted yachts

Other sanctioned yacht owners
Below a list of yachts that have not directly been impacted by sanctions but do have owners that are on one or more sanction lists.

See also
 List of large sailing yachts
 List of motor yachts by length
 Luxury yacht
 Sailing yacht

Citations

External links
 Ship arrest explanation at marineinsight.com

Sanctions and boycotts during the Russo-Ukrainian War
Sanctioned due to Russo-Ukrainian War
International sanctions
Sanctions against Russia
Reactions to the 2022 Russian invasion of Ukraine